Camlin Fine Sciences Ltd., formerly known as Camlin Fine Chemicals, is an Indian corporation that manufactures chemicals to improve the shelf life of food and other products, aromatic compounds, and performance chemicals. CFS has emerged as the largest producer of food antioxidants such as tert-Butylhydroquinone (TBHQ) and Butylated hydroxyanisole (BHA). It is also one of the world's leading Vanillin producers.

CFS has offices and manufacturing facilities in several countries, such as India, China, Italy, Brazil, Mexico and the United States. Having established global leadership in antioxidants, CFS expanded their business with forward integrated into antioxidant blends and has widened its application to the food and beverage industry, pet food, animal feed, fishmeal, aquaculture, biodiesel, etc.

Camlin Fine Sciences holds the patent for improved process in synthesis of BHA Butylated hydroxyanisole from TBHQ tert-Butylhydroquinone

History 
In 1984, Camlin Fine Chemicals Division was started by Camlin with the setting up of a new ultra modern plant at Tarapur, India.

In 2006, Camlin Fine Chemicals demerged from the parent company and an entirely new entity was formed called Camlin Fine Sciences Ltd.

In 2007, CFS was listed on the Bombay Stock Exchange

In 2011, CFS got listed on the National Stock Exchange.

In 2011, CFS took the firm overseas with the acquisition of Borregaard Italia SpA, a Hydroquinone and Catechol manufacturing facility at Ravenna, Italy through its wholly owned subsidiary in Mauritius.

In 2014, CFS began operations in Brasil through its 100% subsidiary company CFS do Brasil Ltd, where it commenced production of antioxidant blends for food applications.

In 2016, CFS acquired 65% stake in Dresen Quimica S.A.P.I.de C.V., Mexico along with its group companies and subsidiaries.

In July 2017, CFS became the 3rd largest producer of vanillin in the world with the acquisition of 51% stake in Ningbo Wanglong Flavors & Fragrances Company Ltd., China.

In November 2017, CFS entered into a preferred supply agreement with Lockheed Martin Advanced Energy Storage for manufacturing and supply of a specialty chemical. In April 2018, CFS entered into an Animal Nutrition joint venture with Pahang Pharma (S) Pte. Ltd., Singapore.

Business verticals

Shelf life solutions 
Having established global leadership in antioxidants, CFS moved forward in blending by setting up a unit in Tarapur, India and in Brazil in 2014. Today, CFS has its blending facilities across the world (India, China, Mexico, USA and Brazil). It has a portfolio of more than 100 traditional and natural shelf life solution products under the brand names Xtendra and NaSure. The company has widened its applications for different food industries such as snacks, bakery, meat & poultry, spices & seasonings, etc. and has also tapped potential shelf life solutions in fried snacks, pet food, fishmeal, biodiesel, confectionery, animal feed.

CFS acquired a 65% stake in Dresen Quimica S.A.P.I. de C.V., Mexico, to cover Central America and Andean States. Dresen is in the Mexican food and feed blends business. With this acquisition, the portfolio expanded to geographies in Mexico and Central America with products like antioxidant blends (traditional and natural), feed additives etc.

Aroma ingredients
CFS produces vanillin and ethyl vanillin using fully traceable vertically integrated production. CFS uses an environmentally friendly method for producing vanillin and ethyl vanillin (sold under the brand name Vanesse and Evanil respectively) from Catechol. The company makes all key ingredients in-house and has gained acceptance as a quality global vanillin player. The brands Vanesse (vanillin) and Evanil (ethyl vanillin) have grown their customer base not only from food and flavor industry, but also manufacturers of fragrances, incense sticks and pharmaceuticals industries and perfumeries.

The company has also launched floral booster, which is specially developed for incense stick industry to enhance sweet note, sustain burning and aroma-spreading properties along with Intense Green-a fragrance and flavour chemical, and Vetigreen-an aromatic chemical for home cleaning solutions, personal care products, cosmetics and incense sticks.

Performance chemicals
The company entered into performance chemicals segment with the acquisition of Borregaard Italia Spa ltd in March 2011 and became one of the largest producers of di‐phenols (Hydroquinone and Catechol). To cater the demand from the market CFS has doubled its guaiacol capacity to 4000 tonnes per annum and raised veratrole capacity by 67% to 1000 tonnes per annum in FY16 and this will lead to 17% sales CAGR over FY15‐18 to Rs 2.04bn. CFS has distribution hubs in different parts of the world to cater to customer demands.

References 

Manufacturing companies based in Mumbai
Chemical companies established in 1931
Indian brands
Chemical companies of India
Companies listed on the Bombay Stock Exchange
Companies listed on the National Stock Exchange of India